is a Shinto shrine in the Ichinomiya neighborhood of the city of Okayama in Okayama Prefecture, Japan. It is the ichinomiya of former Bizen Province. The main festival of the shrine is held annually on the third weekend of October.

Enshrined kami
The kami enshrined at Kibitsuhiko Jinja are:
 , the son of Emperor Kōrei and conqueror of the Kingdom of Kibi
 , younger brother or son of Kibitsuhiko
 
 
 
 
 , brother of Kibitsuhiko
 
 , elder sister of Kibitsuhiko
 , younger sister of Kibitsuhiko
 , elder sister of Kibitsuhiko

History
The origins of Kibitsuhiko Jinja are uncertain. According to the shrine's legend', it was during the reign of Empress Suiko, and was the site of Kibitsuhiko-no-Mikoto's residence; but the shrine does not appear in any historical documentation until the late Heian period. However, Ani Jinja  sided with Fujiwara no Sumitomo in his revolt from 939 to 941 and was thus demoted. On the other hand, Kibitsu Shrine, the parent shrine of the Kibitsuhiko Jinja wrote prayers for the victory of imperial forces over Fujiwara no Sumitomo, and was thus rewarded by having their branch shrine in Bizen raised to become the ichinomiya. During the Sengoku period, the shrine was burned down by the Matsuda clan, but was restored with the support of Ukita Naoie. Toyotomi Hideyoshi prayed here for victory prior to his attack on Takamatsu Castle.

In the Edo period, Ikeda Toshitaka, the daimyō of Himeji Domain and the lord of Okayama Castle, rebuilt the shrine, and successive rulers of Okayama Domain sponsored various repairs and reconstructions. The shrine buildings that can be seen today were completed in 1936.

The shrine is a three-minute walk from Bizen-Ichinomiya Station on the JR West Kibi Line.

Cultural Properties
Tachi Japanese sword. Edo Period, National Important Cultural Property. Signed by Ikeda Shinkai and dated 1678, this sword was donation to the shrine by Ikeda Tsunamasa, It is now kept at the Okayama Prefectural Museum.

Gallery

See also
Ichinomiya

References

External links

Official home page

Shinto shrines in Okayama Prefecture
Bizen Province
Okayama
Ichinomiya
Beppyo shrines